Sovetskoye is a rural locality (a selo) and the administrative center of Sovetskoye Rural Settlement, Alexeyevsky District, Belgorod Oblast, Russia. The population was 1,006 as of 2010. There are 15 streets.

Geography 
Sovetskoye is located 47 km southeast of Alexeyevka (the district's administrative centre) by road. Zapolnoye is the nearest rural locality.

References 

Rural localities in Alexeyevsky District, Belgorod Oblast
Biryuchensky Uyezd